Subi Suresh (1981/1982 – 22 February 2023) was an Indian Malayalam actress, television host, comedian, and stage-show performer. She is known mainly for her role in popular Malayalam movies such as Thaskara Lahala (2010), Grihanathan (2012), and Drama (2018). She is known for her comic voice and managed to make her own space in comedy. Subi also worked as a professional comedian and television anchor, and appeared in TV shows such as Cinemala.

Early life
Subi Suresh was born in Tripunithura, Ernakulam district and raised in a well-to-do Hindu family from Kochi, Kerala, India. Her parents are Suresh and Ambika. She completed her schooling from Tripunithura Government School and received her college education from St. Teresa's College in Ernakulam.

Career
Subi is mostly known among the Malayali audience for her comedy shows. She started her career in August 1993 as an anchor for Cinemala. She entered the Malayalam film industry in 2001 with the film Aparannar Nagarathil, directed by Nisar. Suresh subsequently acted in more than twenty films including Elsamma Enna Aankutty, Panchavarna Tatta, Happy Husbands, and Drama.

Subi later made appearances in the television series Thaksara Lahala (2010) and Kuttipattalam as well as the movie Grihanathan (2012). She also participated in various Malayalam TV shows as an anchor and a comedian. She was a member of the Cochin Kalabhavan troupe, and was the face of popular comedy shows at a time when women participation in mimicry was uncommon.

Death
On 22 February 2023, Subi died at Rajagiri Hospital in Kochi from liver disease. She was 41.

Filmography
Source:

Television

References

1980s births
Year of birth missing
2023 deaths
20th-century Indian actresses
21st-century Indian actresses
Actresses in Malayalam cinema
Actresses in Tamil cinema
Actresses in Malayalam television 
Deaths from liver disease
People from Ernakulam district